Street King may refer to

Films
 The Street King, a 2002 film
 Street Kings, a 2008 film starring Keanu Reeves, Forest Whitaker, Hugh Laurie, Chris Evans, Common, and The Game

Brands
 Street King (drink), a flavored energy drink

Music
 Street King (album), a 2011 Trae tha Truth album
Street Kings, a 2009 mixtape by Bossman (rapper)